The 2012 FIM Team Ice Speedway Gladiators World Championship was the 34th edition and the 2011 version of FIM Team Ice Racing World Championship season. The Final will take place in Tolyatti, Russia on 25-26 February 2011. The championship was won by the defending champion Russia (59 points), who they beat Austria (44 pts) and Czech Republic (37 pts).

World Final

Results 

 25-26 February 2011
  Tolyatti, Samara Oblast
Anatoly Stepanov Stadium (Length: 300m)
Referee:  Marek Wojaczek
Jury President:  Petr Ondrasik
References

Heat details - Day One

Heat details - Day Two

See also 
 2012 Individual Ice Racing World Championship
 2012 Speedway World Cup in classic speedway
 2012 Speedway Grand Prix in classic speedway

References 

Ice speedway competitions
World Team